Kootenay, Kootenai, and Kutenai may refer to:

Ethnic groups
The Kutenai, also known as the Ktunaxa, Kootenai, or Kootenay, an indigenous people of the United States and Canada
Kutenai language, the traditional language of the Kutenai
Ktunaxa Nation, a First Nations government in British Columbia, Canada
Kootenai Tribe of Idaho, a federally recognized tribe in Idaho, United States,
Confederated Salish and Kootenai Tribes, a federally recognized tribe in Montana, United States

Places

Communities
Kootenai, Idaho, United States
Kootenay, British Columbia, Canada
Kootenay Bay, an unincorporated community in British Columbia, Canada
Kootenai County, Idaho, United States
Diocese of Kootenay, a diocese of the Ecclesiastical Province of British Columbia and the Yukon of the Anglican Church of Canada
List of electoral districts in the Kootenays, electoral districts in the Kootenays region of British Columbia
Kootenay (electoral district), a former electoral district in British Columbia, Canada

Geographical features
Kootenai National Forest, a national forest in Montana and Idaho, United States
The Kootenays, a region of southeastern British Columbia, Canada
Kootenay Canal, a hydroelectric power station in British Columbia, Canada
Kootenay Group, a geologic formation in British Columbia, Canada
Kootenay Lake, on the Kootenay River in British Columbia, Canada
Kootenay National Park, a national park in British Columbia at the source of the Kootenay River
Kootenay Pass, a mountain pass in the Selkirk Mountains of British Columbia, Canada
Kootenay Ranges, part of the Canadian Rockies
Kootenay River, or Kutenai River in the United States, a river that runs through British Columbia, Idaho, and Montana

Transportation
Kootenay Direct Airlines, a former airline based in Nelson, British Columbia, Canada
Kootenay Highway, part of British Columbia Highway 93
Kootenay Loop, a public transit exchange in Vancouver, British Columbia, Canada
HMCS Kootenay, Royal Canadian Navy ships of the name
SS Kootenay, a steamboat that served the Arrow Lakes in British Columbia, Canada

Other uses
Kootenay Brown (1839–1916), Irish-born Canadian polymath, soldier, trader and conservation advocate
Kootanae House, a historical North West Company fur trade post near present-day Invermere, British Columbia
The Kootenay Ice, a junior ice hockey team based in Cranbrook, British Columbia, Canada

See also